Murrow West railway station was a station on the Great Northern and Great Eastern Joint Railway in Murrow, Cambridgeshire between Spalding, England, and March. It opened in 1867 and was closed by the British Transport Commission in July 1953 due to low usage.  The line itself survived until closure by British Rail in November 1982.  The station has mostly been demolished although the signal box still survives, having been converted into a private dwelling after the closure of the line and subsequent removal of the track.

A second station for the village, Murrow East railway station, was situated on the Midland and Great Northern Joint Railway a short distance away - this route intersected the GN&GE Joint line on the level immediately to the north of Murrow West station and signal box.

References

External links
 Murrow West station on navigable 1946 O. S. map

Disused railway stations in Cambridgeshire
Former Great Northern and Great Eastern Joint Railway stations
Railway stations in Great Britain opened in 1867
Railway stations in Great Britain closed in 1953
1867 establishments in England
Fenland District